Bodyheat is the 44th studio album by American musician James Brown. The album was released in December 1976, by Polydor Records. It includes the singles "Bodyheat" and "Kiss in '77". It was produced and arranged by James Brown. The cover and art work was by the Virginia Team.

The back of the cover features a text written by James Brown titled "Brand New Sound".

"Sometimes the serpent of the devil is
so strong, it takes the bodyheat of
God to keep him away. So do good,
think good and you'll be good to your
fellow man- and to all humanity.

Listen to this album. Not only will the
spiritual feeling get to you, but the
'groove' will, too.

Undying Dedication To You,
JAMES BROWN
(With the feeling of a new
beginning... A New Sound!)"

Track listing

References

James Brown albums
Polydor Records albums
1976 albums
Albums produced by James Brown